Jonathan Fisk (September 26, 1778  – July 13, 1832) was an American lawyer and politician who served as United States Representative for the third District of New York.

Early life
Fisk was born in Amherst, Hillsborough County, New Hampshire, attended the public schools, taught school in Weare, New Hampshire, and later removed to New York City to read law. He was admitted to the bar in Westchester County, New York, in 1799, and began to practice in Newburgh, New York in 1800.

Career
Elected as a Democratic-Republican to the 11th United States Congress, Fisk was United States Representative for the third district of New York from March 4, 1809 to March 3, 1811. He was again elected to the 13th and 14th United States Congresses, representing the sixth district of New York from March 4, 1813 to March 21, 1815, when he accepted a recess appointment by President James Madison as United States Attorney for the Southern District of New York. He was confirmed by the United States Senate on January 6, 1816, and remained in office until June 30, 1819. Afterwards he resumed the practice of law.

Death
Fisk died in Newburgh, Orange County, New York on July 13, 1832 (age 53 years, 291 days). He is interred at Old Town Cemetery, Newburgh, New York.

Family life
Fisk was the son of Mary Bragg Fisk and Jonathan Fisk, who was appointed Judge of Probate for the District of Randolph in 1800. He married Sarah Van Kleek (1773–1832) and they had four children, Theodore S, James L, Delphine R. E., and Mary M.

References

External links

Jonathan Fisk biography at Old Bios

1778 births
1832 deaths
Politicians from Newburgh, New York
United States Attorneys for the Southern District of New York
People from Amherst, New Hampshire
Democratic-Republican Party members of the United States House of Representatives from New York (state)
18th-century American educators